Corpo Elétrico is a 2017 Brazilian film directed and written by Marcelo Caetano.

Cast 
Kelner Macêdo	...	Elias
Lucas Andrade	...	Wellington
Welket Bungué	...	Fernando
Ana Flavia Cavalcanti	...	Carla
Daniel Torres	...	Cristovão
Dani Nefussi	...	Diana
Emerson Ferreira	...	Gilberto
Ernani Sanchez	...	Walter
Evandro Cavalcante	...	Alexandre

Awards 
Guadalajara International Film Festival
Best Feature Film

Outfest
Grand Jury Award - Honorable Mention	

Rotterdam International Film Festival
Best First Film (Nominee)

San Sebastián International Film Festival
Best Latin American Film (Nominee)

São Paulo Association of Art Critics Awards
Best Film

References

External links 
 

2017 films
2010s Portuguese-language films
Brazilian LGBT-related films